Alpine is a town in Lincoln County, Wyoming, United States. The population was 828 at the 2010 census.

Geography
Alpine is located at the southern end of the Snake River Canyon where the Snake River enters Palisades Reservoir. The town is also known as Alpine Junction since it marks the point where U.S. routes 26 and 89 turn in opposite directions. The two routes run concurrently through the Snake River Canyon from Jackson. In Alpine, Route 89 turns south toward Afton, while Route 26 turns north and follows the edge of Palisades Reservoir to Swan Valley, Idaho.  Three rivers come together in the vicinity of Alpine: the Snake, the Salt, and the Greys - the Greys merges with the Snake right at the high water mark of the reservoir, while the Salt discharges directly into the reservoir nearby unless the reservoir is exceptional low.

Climate
This climatic region is typified by large seasonal temperature differences, with warm to hot (and often humid) summers and cold (sometimes severely cold) winters.  According to the Köppen Climate Classification system, Alpine has a humid continental climate, abbreviated "Dfb" on climate maps.

Demographics

2010 census
As of the census of 2010, there were 828 people, 346 households, and 221 families living in the town. The racial makeup of the town was 95.2% White, 0.4% African American, 0.2% Native American, 0.5% Asian, 2.4% from other races, and 1.3% from two or more races. Hispanic or Latino of any race were 5.6% of the population.

There were 346 households, of which 29.5% had children under the age of 18 living with them, 53.8% were married couples living together, 5.8% had a female householder with no husband present, 4.3% had a male householder with no wife present, and 36.1% were non-families. 20.2% of all households were made up of individuals, and 1.8% had someone living alone who was 65 years of age or older. The average household size was 2.39 and the average family size was 2.83.

The median age in the town was 36.6 years. 21% of residents were under the age of 18; 8.1% were between the ages of 18 and 24; 37.8% were from 25 to 44; 27.3% were from 45 to 64; and 5.8% were 65 years of age or older. The gender makeup of the town was 53.3% male and 46.7% female.

2000 census
As of the census of 2000, there were 550 people, 217 households, and 146 families living in the town. The population density was 787.9 people per square mile (303.4/km2). There were 274 housing units at an average density of 392.5 per square mile (151.1/km2). The racial makeup of the town was 96.73% White, 0.73% Native American, 0.73% Asian, 0.18% Pacific Islander, and 1.64% from two or more races. Hispanic or Latino of any race were 1.09% of the population.

There were 217 households, out of which 27.6% had children under the age of 18 living with them, 61.8% were married couples living together, 5.1% had a female householder with no husband present, and 32.7% were non-families. 18.4% of all households were made up of individuals, and 3.2% had someone living alone who was 65 years of age or older. The average household size was 2.53 and the average family size was 2.99.

In the town, the population was spread out, with 23.8% under the age of 18, 6.5% from 18 to 24, 36.7% from 25 to 44, 25.3% from 45 to 64, and 7.6% who were 65 years of age or older. The median age was 36 years. For every 100 females, there were 107.5 males. For every 100 females age 18 and over, there were 97.6 males.

The median income for a household in the town was $45,313, and the median income for a family was $47,813. Males had a median income of $35,313 versus $23,036 for females. The per capita income for the town was $21,223. About 3.4% of families and 5.1% of the population were below the poverty line, including 4.1% of those under age 18 and none of those age 65 or over.

Education
Public education in the town of Alpine is provided by Lincoln County School District #2.

Alpine has a public library, a branch of the Lincoln County Library System.

Transportation
Alpine is served by a START Bus service to Jackson which runs 3 times a day on weekdays.

Alpine Airport is a privately-owned, public use airport located one mile northwest of the town of Alpine on the Idaho-Wyoming state line.

See also
List of municipalities in Wyoming

References

External links

 Town website

Towns in Lincoln County, Wyoming
Towns in Wyoming